Chengzhong is one of four districts of the prefecture-level city of Xining, the capital of Qinghai Province, Northwest China.

Subdivisions
 Renmin Street Subdistrict
 Nantan Subdistrict
 Cangmen Street Subdistrict
 Lirang Street Subdistrict
 Yinma Street Subdistrict
 Nanchuan East Road Subdistrict
 Nanchuan West Road Subdistrict
 Zhongzhai Town

See also
 List of administrative divisions of Qinghai

External links 
 Information page

County-level divisions of Qinghai
Xining